Law of the Lawless may refer to:

Law of the Lawless (1923 film), an American silent drama film 
Law of the Lawless (1964 film), an American film
Brigada a.k.a. Law of the Lawless, a 2002 Russian TV miniseries